The 2012 Louisville Cardinals football team represented the University of Louisville in the 2012 NCAA Division I FBS football season. The Cardinals were led by third-year head coach Charlie Strong and played their home games at Papa John's Cardinal Stadium. They were a member of the Big East Conference. They finished the season 11–2, 5–2 in Big East play to finish in a four-way tie for the Big East championship. As the highest rated of the four Big East champions in the final BCS poll, the Cardinals received the conference's automatic bid into a BCS game. They were invited to the Sugar Bowl where they upset the heavily favored Florida Gators.

Previous season
The Cardinals finished the 2011 season 7–6, and a 5–2 record in Big East play gave them a share of the conference championship with Cincinnati and West Virginia. Due to tiebreaking procedures, the Cardinals did not receive the Big East's automatic bid into a BCS bowl (West Virginia received the bid). The Cardinals were instead invited to the Belk Bowl where they were defeated by North Carolina State 24–31.

Personnel

Coaching staff

Schedule

Rankings

Roster

References

Louisville
Louisville Cardinals football seasons
Big East Conference football champion seasons
Sugar Bowl champion seasons
Louisville Cardinals football